The 143rd Army Division(3rd Formation) was formed in November 1969. As of December 1969 the division was composed of:
427th Infantry Regiment;
428th Infantry Regiment;
429th Infantry Regiment;
Artillery Regiment.

The division belonged to Guangzhou Military Region, while under the command of 42nd Army Corps. It stationed in Taishan, Guangdong for agricultural production mission.

In November 1978 the division was disbanded.

References

Infantry divisions of the People's Liberation Army
Military units and formations established in 1969
Military units and formations disestablished in 1978